Santiago Nicolás Mederos Pascal (born 16 January 1998) is a Uruguayan professional footballer who plays as a midfielder for Plaza Colonia.

Club career
Mederos is a youth academy graduate of Danubio. He made his professional debut for the club on 3 March 2019 in a 1–0 league win against Cerro. He scored his first goal on 15 September 2019 in a 1–2 defeat against Cerro Largo.

International career
Mederos is a former Uruguayan youth national team player. He was part of Uruguay squad at 2015 South American U-17 Championship.

Career statistics

References

External links
 

1998 births
Living people
Footballers from Montevideo
Association football midfielders
Uruguayan footballers
Uruguayan expatriate footballers
Uruguay youth international footballers
Uruguayan Primera División players
Uruguayan Segunda División players
Danubio F.C. players
Liverpool F.C. (Montevideo) players
Deportes La Serena footballers
Primera B de Chile players
Expatriate footballers in Chile